New Korea Party of Hope (NKPH, Huimangui Sinhanguk Dang) was a small political party in South Korea. It participated in the 2000 elections in South Korea, winning one seat. It has been described as conservative.

Electoral results

See also
Politics of South Korea

References

Conservative parties in South Korea
Defunct political parties in South Korea